(abbreviation for disk free) is a standard Unix command used to display the amount of available disk space for file systems on which the invoking user has appropriate read access.  is typically implemented using the statfs or statvfs system calls.

History
 for Unix-like systems is part of the X/Open Portability Guide since issue 2 of 1987. It was inherited into the first version of POSIX and the Single Unix Specification. It first appeared in Version 1 AT&T Unix.

The version of  bundled in GNU coreutils was written by Torbjorn Granlund, David MacKenzie, and Paul Eggert. The command is available as a separate package for Microsoft Windows as part of the UnxUtils collection of native Win32 ports of common GNU Unix-like utilities.

Usage
 df [-k] [-P|-t] [-del] [file...]

Use 1024-byte units, instead of the default 512-byte units, when writing space figures.

Use a standard, portable, output format

Display in more easily human readable units such as KB, MB, GB or TB.

Write the amount of free space of the file system containing the specified file

GNU  includes  as well, listing filesystem type information, but the GNU  shows the sizes in 1K blocks by default.

Specification
The Single Unix Specification (SUS) specifies by original space is reported in blocks of 512 bytes, and that at a minimum, the file system names and the amount of free space.

This does not mandate that the file system itself be based on 512-byte blocks. The  option was added as a compromise measure. It was agreed by the standard developers that 512 bytes was the best default unit because of its complete historical consistency on System V (versus the mixed 512/1024-byte usage on BSD systems), and that a  option to switch to 1024-byte units was a good compromise. Users who prefer the more logical 1024-byte quantity can easily   to  without breaking many historical scripts relying on the 512-byte units.

The output with  consists of one line of information for each specified file system. These lines are formatted as follows:

      

In the following list, all quantities expressed in 512-byte units (1024-byte when -k is specified) will be rounded up to the next higher unit. The fields are:

The name of the file system, in an implementation-defined format.

The total size of the file system in 512-byte units.

The total amount of space allocated to existing files in the file system, in 512-byte units.

The total amount of space available within the file system for the creation of new files by unprivileged users, in 512-byte units. When this figure is less than or equal to zero, it shall not be possible to create any new files on the file system without first deleting others, unless the process has appropriate privileges. The figure written may be less than zero.

The percentage of the normally available space that is currently allocated to all files on the file system. This shall be calculated using the fraction:

expressed as a percentage. This percentage may be greater than 100 if  is less than zero. The percentage value shall be expressed as a positive integer, with any fractional result causing it to be rounded to the next highest integer.

The directory below which the file system hierarchy appear

Example
Example outputs of the df command:
$ df
Filesystem      1K-blocks      Used  Available Use% Mounted on
udev             48764976         0   48764976   0% /dev
tmpfs             9757068    173100    9583968   2% /run
/dev/sda2      1824504008 723009800 1008791744  42% /
tmpfs            48785328         0   48785328   0% /dev/shm
tmpfs                5120         0       5120   0% /run/lock
tmpfs            48785328         0   48785328   0% /sys/fs/cgroup
/dev/sda1          523248      3672     519576   1% /boot/efi
$ df -i
Filesystem        Inodes   IUsed     IFree IUse% Mounted on
udev            12191244     500  12190744    1% /dev
tmpfs           12196332     702  12195630    1% /run
/dev/sda2      115859456 2583820 113275636    3% /
tmpfs           12196332       1  12196331    1% /dev/shm
tmpfs           12196332       5  12196327    1% /run/lock
tmpfs           12196332      16  12196316    1% /sys/fs/cgroup
/dev/sda1              0       0         0     - /boot/efi
$ df -h
Filesystem      Size  Used Avail Use% Mounted on
udev             47G     0   47G   0% /dev
tmpfs           9.4G  170M  9.2G   2% /run
/dev/sda2       1.7T  690G  963G  42% /
tmpfs            47G     0   47G   0% /dev/shm
tmpfs           5.0M     0  5.0M   0% /run/lock
tmpfs            47G     0   47G   0% /sys/fs/cgroup
/dev/sda1       511M  3.6M  508M   1% /boot/efi

See also
 List of Unix commands
 du (Unix)

References

External links

Manual pages
 df — manual page from GNU coreutils
 
 The df Command – by The Linux Information Project (LINFO)

Standard Unix programs
Unix SUS2008 utilities